Haşımxanlı (also, Gashimkhanly) is a village and municipality in the Sabirabad Rayon of Azerbaijan.  It has a population of 2,200.

References 

Populated places in Sabirabad District